Oscar Peterson and Nelson Riddle is a 1963 album by Oscar Peterson with orchestra arranged and conducted by Nelson Riddle. The album was produced by Norman Granz and released on Verve Records.

The album was also reissued in 1984  as Oscar Peterson: The Silver Collection with four tracks added that were recorded by his Trio in 1964, "Con Alma", "Maids of Cadiz", "My Heart Stood Still" and "Woody 'n' You", but omitting track two of the recording with Riddle ("Judy").

The original album was remastered and re-released by Verve in 2009.

Riddle was nominated at the 7th Annual Grammy Awards for the Grammy Award for Best Jazz Performance – Large Group (Instrumental) for his work on this album.

Response
Billboard magazine described the album as follows: "A neat teaming of talents here brings Peterson more strongly into the pop area than at any time in the past. Riddle's arrangements blend handsomely with their 10 celli, 5 horn and 5 flute voicings, with Peterson's perhaps underplayed pianistics here. There is, in fact, a kind of Claude Thornhill quality to these proceedings, making for strong mood as well as jazz buyer appeal."

The album was nominated at the 1965 Grammy Awards in the category of Best Instrumental Jazz Performance - Large Group or Soloist with Large Group.

Track listing
 "My Foolish Heart" (Ned Washington, Victor Young) – 5:00
 "Judy" (Hoagy Carmichael, Sammy Lerner) – 3:39
 "'Round Midnight" (Thelonious Monk) – 4:08
 "Some Day My Prince Will Come" (Frank Churchill, Larry Morey) – 2:52
 "Come Sunday" (Duke Ellington) – 3:24
 "Nightingale" (Oscar Peterson) – 4:13
 "My Ship" (Ira Gershwin, Kurt Weill) – 5:42
 "A Sleepin' Bee" (Harold Arlen, Truman Capote) – 3:43
 "Portrait of Jenny" (Gordon Burdge, J. Russel Robinson) – 4:28
 "Goodbye" (Gordon Jenkins) – 4:05

Track List for Oscar Peterson:  The Silver Collection (Polygram Records October 25, 1990).
 "My Foolish Heart"
 "Round Midnight"
 "Someday My Prince Will Come"
 "Come Sunday"
 "Nightingale"
 "My Ship"
 "A Sleeping Bee"
 "Portrait of Jenny"
 "Goodbye"
 "Con Alma" (Dizzy Gillespie)
 "Maidens of Cadiz" (Léo Delibes)
 "My Heart Stood Still"
 "Woody 'n' You" (Dizzy Gillespie)

Personnel
 Oscar Peterson – piano
 Nelson Riddle – arranger, conductor

References

1963 albums
Oscar Peterson albums
Albums arranged by Nelson Riddle
Albums produced by Norman Granz
Verve Records albums
Albums conducted by Nelson Riddle